Glen View is a high-density suburb in Harare, Zimbabwe. Nearby suburbs include Highfield, Waterfalls and Mbare.

History

Glen View residents were allocated residential stands by the Abel Muzorewa regime in 1979. Abel Muzorewa was the Prime Minister of Zimbabwe Rhodesia. The community was established under a rent to buy housing scheme where home owners would receive their title deeds after twenty-five years.

Governance

Current councillors

Current Members of Parliament

Geography
Glen View borders with other townships like Glen Norah and Budiriro. It is divided into sections 1, 2, 3, 4, 7, Area 8 and earlier extensions.

Location
It is located in the South-Western parts of Zimbabwe's Capital City, at a distance of 14 km from Harare's Central Business District to the North-East in the wetlands plateau of Manyame River catchment area.

Wetlands
Glen View is slowly encroaching towards wetlands due to bad governance by local authorities and land barons. Manyame Conservation Trust oversees wetland management in Glen View territory.

Demographics
One of the most populous agglomeration in Zimbabwe.

Population density
Land disputes are to be expected in one of the most populous suburbs in Harare. One incident resulted in a shooting.

Human resources

Education

There is a number of public and private institutions operating in the area, from kindergartens to primary and secondary schools. Zimbabwe's Ministry of Primary and Secondary Education governs up to ten schools.

The Government and Council provide both Primary education, Secondary education and Early child development in Glen View, as well as other Private schools.

Schools

Economics
Glen View's informal sectors play the larger part of investment in the community though the unforeseen hinders progress.

ZESA Harare Southern Region Headquarters is located in Glen View 1.

Public safety
Zimbabwe Republic Police is the only visible safety providing entity within Glen View. In the 2000s and 2010s there was a wave of politically induced violence in Glen View. Among other incidents, in 2011 the police went in to break-up an opposition party (MDC-T) rally, resulting in a riot, and the death of a policeman.

Public health
The City Council of Harare puts its efforts in maintaining the health of the population by it providing clinics, waterworks and the collection of refuse.

Frequent water crisis hit this area  sparking disease outbreaks 

Home industries established in the area have posed a threat to the environment despite efforts by the council.

In a report, Zimbabwe's Environmental Management Agency, (EMA) said Harare council had neglected Glen View.

List of hospitals and medical centers in Glen View

Here is a list of hospitals and medical centers in Glen View:

Community centers

Glen View has community halls in areas 1 and 3. They are commercially open to the public by renting out for social activity such as religious gatherings and others. The centers are local-government-owned and at times used for public information and information gathering. Government schools have provided facilities for larger gatherings like elections due to their security and space.

Culture and contemporary life

Recreation
A number of locations have become popular go to places for a residents.

 Guruwuswa Cultural Arts Village - Ancient Mbare site.
 Freedom junction

Notable people

These figures either reside in or originate from Glen View.

Local Sports Clubs and Academies
 Starlight Sports Academy (Glen View 1 Primary)
 Maningi Queens
 Light Fc
 Glen View Community Football Academy (GV 9, pry)
 Weerams (GV 4 Primary)
 Stylezone ( GV3 Secondary)

See also
 Harare
 Mbare
 Highfield
 Glen Norah

References

Geography of Zimbabwe
Suburbs of Harare